China used to operate several separate maritime law enforcement agencies. These services operated ships as well as their own small aviation units to assist their maritime patrol capabilities. In July 2013, the functions of these services were taken over by the unified China Coast Guard (CCG).

Former services

Maritime Safety Administration
The China Maritime Safety Administration (China MSA, Chinese: 中国海事局) was a government agency which coordinated maritime search and rescue in the territorial waters of the PRC. The CMSA was part of the Ministry of Transport.

MSA ships were named "Haixun-XX" or "Haibiao-XX", where XX is a number.

Marine Surveillance
The China Marine Surveillance (CMS; Chinese: 中国海监) was created on 19 October 1998 as a paramilitary maritime law enforcement agency under the auspices of China's State Oceanic Administration. It was responsible for law enforcement within China's territorial waters, exclusive economic zones (EEZ), and shores. It was also charged with protecting the maritime environment, natural resources, navigation aids and other facilities, and carried out maritime surveys. In emergencies, it also engaged in search and rescue missions.

According to a 2008 report in China Daily, CMS operated nine aircraft and more than 200 patrol vessels. CMS ships were named "Haijian-XX", where XX is a number.

Fisheries Law Enforcement Command
The China Fisheries Law Enforcement Command (FLEC) was an organ of the Fisheries Management Bureau under the Ministry of Agriculture. It was responsible for the enforcement of laws concerning fishing and maritime resources in Chinese territorial waters and exclusive economic zones (EEZ). It was charged with protecting Chinese fishing vessels and personnel, resolving disputes in fishing activities, preventing illegal fishing, and protecting maritime resources.

FLEC cutters were named "Yuzheng-XX", where XX is a number.

Customs
The PRC's General Administration of Customs operated a maritime anti-smuggling force. Its ships were named "Haiguan-XX", where XX is a number.

References 

Coast guards
China Coast Guard
People's Liberation Army Navy
Specialist law enforcement agencies of China